Lou Frost (24 January 1917 – 28 May 1978) was an  Australian rules footballer who played with South Melbourne in the Victorian Football League (VFL).

Notes

External links 

1917 births
1978 deaths
Australian rules footballers from Tasmania
Sydney Swans players
City-South Football Club players